The Cassandra case was a Spanish court case against Cassandra Vera Paz (born 3 November 1995). Paz was charged in 2016 with injury to victims of terrorism after she posted a series of tweets poking fun at the Franco-era assassination of Luis Carrero Blanco. In 2017, the Audiencia Nacional (National Court) sentenced her to one year in prison plus a seven year penalty of absolute disqualification, which disqualifies a convict from holding public office or employment, and disallows a convict to obtain government grants, scholarships, or any public aid. The ruling was reversed in 2018 by the Supreme Court of Spain, it found that repeating well-known jokes about an attack that happened 44 years ago, about which “endless jokes have been made”, without any abusive comments toward the victim, “is socially and even morally reprehensible in terms of mocking a serious human tragedy,” but “a penal sanction is not proportionate.” The court also took into account Vera’s age – 18 – at the time of publishing the tweets.

History

(Operation Spider) 
Between 2013 and 2016, Cassandra Vera Paz published a series of tweets about the assassination of Francoist Luis Carrero Blanco. Blanco, who was Prime Minister of Spain, was assassinated by the terrorist group Euskadi Ta Askatasuna (ETA) on 20 December 1973. Following an investigation conducted by the information service of the Spanish Civil Guard called  (Operation Spider), Paz was charged for injury to victims of terrorism. According to Paz's testimony, on 13 April 2016, the Civil Guard summoned her to make a statement in relation to a robbery she had reported the previous year. After she arrived at the police station, Paz was informed that she had been criminally charged, and her mobile phone was seized.

National Court trial 
Paz was charged based on the following thirteen tweets and in nearly all of them the key to the humor was the fact that the car, in which Carrero Blanco was traveling, flew high up into the air and over a five-story church, landing on the second-floor terrace of a building. (Spanish quote plus English translation).
 (ETA promoted a policy against official cars combined with a space program).
 (Film: Three Steps Above Heaven. Production Company: ETA films. Director: Argala. Protagonist: Carrero Blanco. Genre: space race).
 (Kissinger gave Carrero Blanco a piece of the moon, ETA paid for the trip).
 (If making jokes about Carrero Blanco is praising terrorism...)
 (Excuse you, @GcekaElectronic, a little respect for the great Carrero, ETA's international space station did all it could.)
 (Can I no longer make jokes about Carrero Blanco?)
 (Elections on the anniversary of Carrero Blanco's space flight. Interesting.)
 Accompanied with an image of Spiderman peering through buildings at a long car.
 (Did Carrero Blanco also go back to the future in his car? #BackToTheFuture.)
 (Happy December 20th) Accompanied with three images: one that is a photograph of the effects after the attack on Blanco and two that recreate the explosion and trajectory of Blanco's official vehicle.
 Accompanied with a photo collage of an astronaut with Blanco's face, on what appears to be the surface of a moon with the Franco-era flag.
 URSS is the Spanish abbreviation for the Soviet Union and Yuri Gagarin, a cosmonaut, was the first human to journey into outer space.
 (With you I want to fly, to be able to see you from the sky, in search of the impossible, that slips through my fingers) Accompanied with an image that depicts the upward flight of Blanco's vehicle.

Paz appeared before the investigating judge on 13 September 2016 with her court-appointed lawyer. The lawyer was later fired because he wanted to base Paz's defense on a claim of mental insanity due to Paz being transgender, and because Paz felt he was ultra-conservative after he told Paz that he was an admirer of Blanco. Paz worked with new lawyers and decided to base her defense on freedom of expression.

The National Court found Paz guilty on 29 March 2017 of the crime of humiliation of the victims of terrorism. The court considered that Paz's tweets, published between 2013 and 2016, constituted contempt, dishonor and mockery towards the victims of terrorism and their families. Public reaction to the ruling was quick and fierce; many, including Blanco's granddaughter, Lucía Carrero-Blanco, thought that regrettable as the tweets may be, freedom of expression should not lead to a prison sentence. She wrote a letter to El País criticizing the two year, six month prison sentence and  described the jail term as “disproportionate and total madness,” adding: “I am frightened by a society where freedom of speech, however regrettable it might be, can mean a jail term.”

Supporters retweeted the offending tweets with new supportive hashtags and some made more offensive jokes. The court also required payment of court costs and the removal of the tweets. The prosecutor Pedro Martínez Torrijos asked for two years and six months of prison, three years' probation, and eight years and six months of absolute disqualification. United Left retweeted the offensive tweets from its official Twitter account.

Supreme Court hearing 
The sentence was appealed before the Supreme Court of Spain citing six reasons.

 For violation of article 20 of the Constitution of Spain, of article 19 of the Universal Declaration of Human Rights and of article 11 of the Charter of Fundamental Rights of the European Union, wherein the right to freedom of speech is inviolable.
 For violation of article 24.2 of the Constitution of Spain, the presumption of innocence, since no sufficient proof of the charge has been made.
 For miscarriage of justice, based on article 579bis of the penal code, for ignoring personal circumstances and the context and the content typical of Twitter.
 For miscarriage of justice by undue application of article 14.3 of the penal code, by failure to apply invincible error and attenuate penalty based on the feasibility of ignorance of the crime.
 For miscarriage of justice by obvious error in the assessment of the evidence presented by the defense.

The public prosecutor challenged all of these points. However, on 26 February 2018, the Supreme Court considered the appeal and reversed the National Court ruling; the court rejected the second reason, but accepted the third and considered it unnecessary to examine the remaining reasons. The court concluded that the tweets did not contain any bitter comment against the victim of the attack nor did they express hurtful, cutting, or insulting phrases or comments against their person; the singular subject of the joke was in the manner in which the attack was carried out with special emphasis on the fact that the car reached a great altitude; and that the attack had taken place forty-four years ago, more than enough time to consider it a historical event whose humorous treatment cannot have the same significance as that of a recent event. Therefore, magistrate , speaking for the court, stated that although the conduct of the accused was reproachable from a social and even moral perspective, the case did not require a response from the penal system, and that the actual response was not appropriate or proportionate.

Vera immediately responded to the news of the Supreme Court ruling: “I’m very happy on a personal level to see the end of a judicial ordeal that no one should have to go through. But I’m very worried about other sentences, such as that of Valtònyc and other rappers and tweeters.”

See also 
 Inés González Árraga
 Detention of Olga Mata

References 

Trials in Spain
2016 in Spain
2017 in Spain